Emanuele Testardi (born 31 December 1990) is an Italian footballer who plays for Italian Eccellenza club Palazzolo. Besides Italy, he has played in Hungary and Australia.

Biography
Born in Rome, Lazio, Testardi started his professional career at Pescara. he played for the reserve since 2006–07 season. He was signed from Libertas Centocelle in 2006, a Rome club located in Centocelle, the 7th municipi of Rome,.

Sampdoria
On 31 August 2009, he was loaned to Sampdoria. He made his Serie A debut for U.C. Sampdoria on 28 February 2010 in a game against Parma F.C.

In June 2010, Sampdoria bought him outright, for €450,000, with Danilo Soddimo moved to Pescara outright for €300,000.
In July 2010, he was loaned to Gubbio. On 31 January 2011, he was about to join Foligno but the deal was not finished in time. He played for Sampdoria's Primavera team instead as overage player, partnered with Simone Zaza.

Lupa Roma
Testardi was released on 18 July 2014. In summer 2014 he was signed by Lupa Roma F.C.

Arezzo
Circa January 2015 Testardi was signed by Arezzo.

Siracusa
In summer 2015 he was signed by Città di Siracusa.

SC Palazzolo
On 7 August 2019, Testardi joined Eccellenza club Palazzolo.

References

External links

1990 births
Living people
Footballers from Rome
Italian footballers
Association football forwards
Delfino Pescara 1936 players
U.C. Sampdoria players
A.S. Gubbio 1910 players
U.S. Pergolettese 1932 players
U.S. Siracusa players
S.S. Virtus Lanciano 1924 players
F.C. Südtirol players
S.S. Arezzo players
Potenza Calcio players
Budapest Honvéd FC players
Lupa Roma F.C. players
Siracusa Calcio players
S.S.D. Acireale Calcio 1946 players
A.C. Gozzano players
Casale F.B.C. players
A.S.D. S.C. Palazzolo players
Serie A players
Serie B players
Serie C players
Serie D players
Nemzeti Bajnokság I players
Italian expatriate footballers
Expatriate footballers in Hungary
Expatriate soccer players in Australia
Italian expatriate sportspeople in Hungary
Italian expatriate sportspeople in Australia
Italy youth international footballers